The first USS Jenkins (DD-42) was a modified  in the United States Navy during World War I. She was named for Rear Admiral Thornton A. Jenkins.

Jenkins was laid down on 24 March 1911 by Bath Iron Works, Bath, Maine; launched on 29 April 1912; sponsored by Miss Alice Jenkins, daughter of Rear Admiral Jenkins; and commissioned on 15 June 1912.

Pre-World War I
In the years that preceded World War I, Jenkins, based at Newport, Rhode Island, trained with the Atlantic Fleet, sailing to the Caribbean for winter maneuvers operating along the East Coast in summer. In addition, she sailed to Tampico, Mexico in mid-April 1914 to support the American occupation of Veracruz. On 1 October 1916 she was in a collision with the lighter Trilby at Sandwich, Massachusetts that resulted in damage to the lighter.

World War I
As the war raged in Europe, Jenkins continued patrol operations along the North American coast in search of possible German U-boats. The patrols and maneuvers sharpened her war-readiness, so that she was ready for any eventuality when she sailed for Europe on 26 May 1917.

Based at Queenstown, Ireland, Jenkins and her sister destroyers patrolled the eastern Atlantic, escorting convoys and rescuing survivors of sunken merchantmen. She continued escort and patrol duty for the duration of the war. Though she made several submarine contacts, no results were determined. Following the signing of the Armistice on 11 November 1918, Jenkins sailed for home, arriving Boston, Massachusetts on 3 January 1919.

Inter-war period
The destroyer operated along the Atlantic coast until arriving at Philadelphia, Pennsylvania on 20 July. She remained there until decommissioning on 31 October. Jenkins was scrapped in 1935 in accordance with the London Naval Treaty.

Notable commanders
LCDR Frederick V. McNair Jr., recipient of Medal of Honor, commanded Jenkins in 1914
CDR Henry D. Cooke received the Navy Cross as Commanding Officer of destroyer Allen. Commanded Jenkins from August 1917 - January 1918
LCDR James L. Kauffman received the Navy Cross for service as Commanding Officer of Jenkins during World War I.

References

External links

 

Paulding-class destroyers
Monaghan-class destroyers
World War I destroyers of the United States
Ships built in Bath, Maine
1912 ships